Memoirs of a Revolutionary, 1901–1941 is a 1951 memoir by Victor Serge. Posted posthumously in French as Mémoires d'un révolutionnaire, Peter Sedgwick translated an abridged version into English in 1963 with Oxford University Press.

References

Further reading

External links 

 

1951 non-fiction books
French-language books